Rodelinda may refer to:

 Rodelinda (opera), an opera seria by George Frideric Handel
 Rodelinda (6th century), wife of King Audoin of Lombardy and mother of King Alboin
 Rodelinda (7th century), wife of King Perctarit of Lombardy (and title character of the Italian opera, above)